The 2017 Vanderbilt Commodores football team represented Vanderbilt University in the 2017 NCAA Division I FBS football season. The Commodores played their home games at Vanderbilt Stadium in Nashville, Tennessee and compete in the East Division of the Southeastern Conference (SEC). They were led by fourth-year head coach Derek Mason. The team earned a final record of 5–7 (1–7 SEC) in a season notable for wins against Kansas State, then in the top 20, and Tennessee, but also for sizeable losses against SEC opponents Alabama (by 59 points), Georgia (by 31), and Missouri (by 28). The Tennessee win at Neyland Stadium was the Commodores' fourth in six games, a feat unequaled by VU in that rivalry since 1926.

Schedule

Vanderbilt announced its 2017 football schedule on September 13, 2016. The 2017 schedule consisted of 7 home games and 5 away games in the regular season. The Commodores hosted SEC foes Alabama, Georgia, Kentucky, and Missouri, and traveled to Florida, Ole Miss, South Carolina, and Tennessee.

The Commodores hosted three of their four non–conference games, against Alabama A&M from the Southwestern Athletic Conference, Kansas State from the Big 12 Conference and Western Kentucky from Conference USA. Vanderbilt traveled to Middle Tennessee (also from Conference USA) and ended a five-game losing streak in opening games dating from 2012.

Schedule Source:

Game summaries

Middle Tennessee

Alabama A&M

Kansas State

Alabama

Florida

Georgia

Ole Miss

South Carolina

Western Kentucky

Kentucky

Missouri

Tennessee

References

Vanderbilt
Vanderbilt Commodores football seasons
Vanderbilt Commodores football